"You Got Lucky" is the first single from Tom Petty and the Heartbreakers' album Long After Dark. The song peaked at #20 on the Billboard Hot 100 and #1 on the Billboard Top Tracks chart, where it stayed for three weeks at the end of 1982. Somewhat unusually for a Petty song, guitars give up the spotlight to allow synths to carry the song's main structure.

Composition
In a November 2003 interview with Songfacts, guitarist Mike Campbell explained the song's origins:

Despite the song's popularity, it was initially rarely played live by the band, since it was not one of Petty's personal favorites; it became more of a staple since 2014.

Reception
Cash Box said that "smoldering synthesizer and guitar melody sets the moody scene" and that there is a "sharp edge" to Petty's vocal, making him sound "earnest and convincing."  Billboard called it a "midtempo ballad which has the moody intensity of 'A Woman in Love'."

Music video
Petty felt the video was "a real groundbreaker," and stated that he and the band wrote the treatment themselves, borrowing heavily from the post-apocalyptic look of Mad Max 2, released in 1981.

The video begins with Tom Petty and Mike Campbell happening upon a black tent in front of the Vasquez Rocks after riding in a hovercar (from the television series Logan's Run). They find a radio/cassette player wrapped in bubble wrap and play the tape, which begins the music of "You Got Lucky." The other band members, Howie Epstein, Benmont Tench and Stan Lynch, arrive in a sidecar racing motorcycle.

Entering the tent, they turn on a bank of cobweb-covered switches that control power for music studio equipment as well as a bank of television sets which show the videos for Tom Petty & The Heartbreakers' "Here Comes My Girl" and "A Woman In Love (It's Not Me)." A clip from the Galactica 1980 episode "Galactica Discovers Earth, Part I" playing on one of the televisions elicits a visceral reaction from Petty, possibly explaining the cause of the destruction in the video's universe. As they explore the tent, Campbell finds a hollow body Gretsch 6120 guitar just in time to play the song's guitar solo. Epstein hits the jackpot on a slot machine, causing coins to flow over his hands. Petty overturns an Astro Invader arcade video game before they all ride away, leaving behind the cassette player.

Personnel
 Tom Petty – lead vocals
 Mike Campbell – rhythm and lead guitars
 Benmont Tench – acoustic piano, synthesizers/Oberheim OB-Xa patch "Synth Brass/Jump Synth Brass" with the vibrato effect/Roland Juno-60 patch “Vibrabell”
 Stan Lynch – drums/LinnDrum
 Howie Epstein – bass guitar, backing vocals
 Phil Jones – percussion

Chart performance

References 

1982 singles
Tom Petty songs
Songs written by Tom Petty
Songs written by Mike Campbell (musician)
Song recordings produced by Jimmy Iovine
1982 songs